Schäppi is a surname. Notable people with the surname include:

 (1819–1908), Swiss politician
Reto Schäppi (born 1991), Swiss professional ice hockey center